Robert Thomas "Bobby" Reynolds (born July 17, 1982) is an American retired professional tennis player who resides in Auburn, Alabama. He was named head men's tennis coach at Auburn University in June 2016.

Professional career
Reynolds, a native of Acworth, Georgia, led the Vanderbilt Commodores to the NCAA Men's Tennis Championship final in 2003, and was named the tournament's MVP (he defeated fellow future pro Amer Delic of Illinois in the team final, but the Commodores fell 4–3 to the Illini in the championship). That same year, he finished the season number one in the nation in singles. He was also named ITA National Player of Month a record three times in '03, and named Southeastern Conference Player of Year in '03, finishing his final season with a 46–7 singles record.  He owned the school record for career wins in singles (99) until 2015. He holds the record for single-season wins (46 in '03).  Reynolds attended Vanderbilt for three years and majored in business, but left in 2003 to pursue his professional tennis aspirations.

He reached the third round of the Australian Open in 2005, defeating Nicolás Almagro and Andrei Pavel before falling to Spaniard Rafael Nadal. In August 2008 he beat world no. 42 Marc Gicquel of France 7–6, 3–6, 6–4. On February 2, 2009, he reached his career high singles ranking when he reached 63rd in the world. In 2006, he teamed with Andy Roddick to capture his first ATP doubles title at the RCA Championships in Indianapolis.

In the second round of 2012 Apia International Sydney, Reynolds won against fellow American John Isner 3–6, 6–4, 6–3, allowing him to progress to the quarterfinals, before he ultimately lost to Jarkko Nieminen from Finland.

He was coached by former pro David Drew.

Reynolds announced his retirement from professional tennis following a fourth consecutive World TeamTennis Eastern Conference Championship win with the Washington Kastles.

Coaching career
Reynolds was named Auburn head coach for men's tennis in June 2016 after serving as an assistant coach for NCAA runner-up Oklahoma (2015-16 season). His career record at Auburn is 46-62 after four seasons in the nation's toughest conference. He was inducted into the Vanderbilt Sports Hall of Fame in 2019.

ATP career finals

Doubles: 3 (1–2)

ATP Challenger and ITF Futures finals

Singles: 19 (11–8)

Doubles: 43 (28–15)

Performance timelines

Singles

Doubles

References

External links
 
 
 Reynolds world ranking history
 Profile on Yahoo Sports
 

1982 births
Living people
American male tennis players
Sportspeople from Barnstable County, Massachusetts
Sportspeople from Cobb County, Georgia
Tennis people from Georgia (U.S. state)
Tennis people from Massachusetts
Vanderbilt Commodores men's tennis players